Patience Okoro (born 10 July 1984) is a Nigerian heptathlete. She won a gold medal in heptathlon at the 2008 African Championships in Athletics held in Addis Ababa, Ethiopia.

Career 
In one of her earliest international senior performances, she started during the 2003 All-Africa Games in Abuja, Nigeria where she won her first international bronze medal. She later placed fifth at the 2006 Africa Championships in Athletics and fourth at the 2011 All-Africa Games competitions. Okoro also won silver medal at the 2007 All-Africa Games and a bronze medal during the 2003 events.

Achievements

African Championships

All African Games

References

External links
 

1984 births
Living people
Nigerian heptathletes
Athletes (track and field) at the 2004 Summer Olympics
Olympic athletes of Nigeria
World Athletics Championships medalists
Nigerian female athletes
African Games gold medalists for Nigeria
African Games medalists in athletics (track and field)
Athletes (track and field) at the 2011 All-Africa Games
Athletes (track and field) at the 2003 All-Africa Games
Athletes (track and field) at the 2007 All-Africa Games